Mike Trainor (born February 6, 1981) is an American stand-up comedian and writer. Currently, Trainor is a writer, producer, and on-air performer for The Howard Stern Show, and has several recurring characters on the show including Jeff the Drunk's "Lump", Bobo's "Toupee", the Hulk, and others. He also provided commentary on the TruTV series truTV Presents: World's Dumbest.

Personal life
Trainor grew up in West Orange, New Jersey. He began performing stand-up comedy in the summer of 2003 after graduating from Elon University. Trainor is a member of the Kappa Alpha Order.

Career
Trainor began his career in New York City. Trainor also started off his career working for the radio stations Q104.3 and WCBS 880 and at the television news station NY1. Trainor has been featured in Maxim Magazine and for a while was a regular contributor to CollegeHumor.com. From 2004 to 2006 he was the co-host and producer of the show "Four Quotas" on Sirius Satellite Radio alongside Steve Hofstetter. In 2012 Trainor was featured in a Golden Corral ad campaign.

Trainor currently is a writer and producer for The Howard Stern Show. He also provided humorous commentary on the show TruTV Presents: World's Dumbest....

Publishing
In 2009, Trainor released a book, Fat Things: They Might Not Make You Fat, But You Have Them in Common with Fat People, published by Giant Books.

Albums
In 2010, Trainor released his first comedy album, Giant, via Next Round Entertainment.

References

External links

1981 births
Living people
People from West Orange, New Jersey
American stand-up comedians
Elon University alumni
21st-century American comedians